Leptodactylus plaumanni is a species of frog in the family Leptodactylidae.
It is found in Argentina, Brazil, and possibly Paraguay.
Its natural habitats are subtropical or tropical moist lowland forests, moist savanna, subtropical or tropical seasonally wet or flooded lowland grassland, intermittent freshwater marshes, pastureland, rural gardens, and heavily degraded former forest.
It is threatened by habitat loss.

References

plaumanni
Amphibians described in 1936
Taxonomy articles created by Polbot